The Samsung Galaxy Watch Active 2 (stylized as Samsung Galaxy Watch Active2) is a smartwatch developed by Samsung Electronics, running the Tizen operating system. Announced on 5 August 2019, the Active 2 was scheduled for availability in the United States starting on 23 September 2019.
 
The Active 2 was released in two sizes, 40mm or 44mm, and two connectivity formats, either Bluetooth or LTE capability. The LTE version functions as a standalone phone and allows a user to call, text, pay, and stream music or video without a nearby smartphone.

Samsung announced as part of the move to move from Tizen OS to Wear OS by Google starting from August 2022. The Watch Active 2 will stop receiving software and security updates while the Watch 3 will stop receiving software updates in 2023.

Specifications

References

External links 
Galaxy Watch Active 2 on Samsung Newsroom
 

Consumer electronics brands
Products introduced in 2019
Smartwatches
Samsung wearable devices